Claire Harrigan (born 1964) is a Scottish artist.

Born in Kilmarnock, Ayrshire, she studied at Glasgow School of Art, graduating with a BA (Hons) Fine Art (Drawing and Painting), in 1986, at which time she received the Mary Armour Award for Still Life Painting. Since Art School she has worked as a full-time painter and travelled widely for inspiration, particularly in the West Indies, France, Portugal and Italy. In 1989, she was elected Professional Member SAAC. In 1992 (and subsequent editions) was listed in "Who's Who in Art" (published by Art Trade Press Ltd), and in 1990, in "20th Century Painters and Sculptors" by Frances Spalding.

In 1992 she was elected a member of The Royal Scottish Society of Painters in Watercolour (RSW).

List of awards
1990 – Lily Macdougall Award, SAAC
1992 – James Torrance Memorial Award, RGI
1996 – Latimer Award, RSA
2002 – Artists Discovery Commission Award, Club Med
2004 – Glasgow Arts Club Fellowship Award, RSW Selected Exhibitions:

Solo exhibitions

Open Eye Gallery, Edinburgh 
Gatehouse Gallery, Glasgow 
Flying Colours Gallery, London 
Bruton Street Gallery, London 
Christopher Hull Gallery, London
Macaulay Gallery, Stenton

List of public collections 

Adam and Company
The Fleming Collection
Bank of Scotland
Heriot-Watt University
South Ayrshire Council
Wigtownshire Educational Trust
Club Med

See also 

The Artist Magazine September 2006 "Masterclass : Bold Design in Mixed Media – Claire Harrigan.
Abstract Techniques And Colour in Painting – Claire Harrigan & Robin Capon Published August 2007

References

1964 births
Living people
Scottish women painters
Alumni of the Glasgow School of Art
Scottish watercolourists
People from Kilmarnock
Women watercolorists
21st-century British women artists